Silvestre Siale Bileka (born 1939?) is an Equato-Guinean politician. Bileka served as Prime Minister from 4 March 1992 to 1 April 1996. He is a member of the Partido Democrático de Guinea Ecuatorial (Democratic Party of Equatorial Guinea).  Bileka also served as President of the Supreme Court, tendering his resignation to President Teodoro Obiang Nguema in January 2004. The official reason for his resignation was "not being able to reach the desired result in terms of improvement of the operation of the judiciary". He was the first senior state official to resign, as the President usually instead simply dismissed his colleagues. He is a Bubi.

References 

1930s births
Living people
Year of birth uncertain
Democratic Party of Equatorial Guinea politicians
Equatoguinean judges
Chief justices
Bubi people
Justice ministers of Equatorial Guinea